Hilario "Sandy" Valdespino Borroto (January 14, 1939 – February 26, 2023) was a Cuban-born corner outfielder in Major League Baseball who played for five different teams in the seven years from  to .

Baseball career

Minor leagues
Signed by fabled Washington Senators scout Joe Cambria in 1957, Valdespino had an extensive minor league career, appearing in more than 1,500 games over 16 seasons through 1974. He spent eight full years in the minor league system of the Senators and their post-1960 successor, the Minnesota Twins. He broke into the major leagues after winning the 1964 batting title of the Triple-A International League with a .337 mark as a member of the Atlanta Crackers.

1965 Minnesota Twins
Valdespino was a 26-year-old rookie with the 1965 Twins, who won a team-record 102 games and the third American League pennant in the franchise's 65-year history. Valdespino spelled regular left fielder Bob Allison and right fielder Tony Oliva, starting 47 games and batting .261 and setting career bests in games played (108), plate appearances (274), at bats (245), runs scored (38), hits (64) and runs batted in (22). He then appeared in five of the seven games of the 1965 World Series, starting in left field in Games 1 and 4, pinch-hitting in three more, and collecting three hits in 11 at bats (.273). He hit a key double in the third inning of Game 1 off Don Drysdale of the Los Angeles Dodgers, part of the Twins' six-run uprising that sealed their 8–2, opening game victory. However, the Dodgers battled back to win the series in the seventh game behind Sandy Koufax.

Remainder of MLB career
After 1965, Valdespino would spend only one more full year——in the major leagues, when he appeared in 99 games for the Twins, batting .165. He was selected by the Atlanta Braves in the Rule 5 draft that winter, and spent the remainder of his big-league career with abbreviated tenures with the Braves and three other teams. In 382 MLB games played (259 for the Twins, 36 for the Braves, 41 for the Houston Astros, 28 for the Seattle Pilots/Milwaukee Brewers, and 18 for the Kansas City Royals), he was credited with 176 hits, with 23 doubles, three triples, seven home runs, and 67 runs batted in. He batted .230 lifetime.

Latin-American leagues
Valdespino also played in Cuban baseball, the Mexican Pacific League (for a team called Cañeros—the "Sugarcane Growers"—from the city of Los Mochis, and Venezuelan Professional Baseball.

Italian League
Valdespino managed the Italian team of the Rimini Pirates, and he led them to a Championship season in 1983.

Personal life and death
Valdespino died in Moultrie, Georgia, on February 26, 2023, at the age of 84.

References

External links

Cohen, Alan, Sandy Valdespino, Society for American Baseball Research Biography Project
Venezuelan Professional Baseball League
Bio from Cool of the Evening: The 1965 Minnesota Twins

1939 births
2023 deaths
Atlanta Braves players
Atlanta Crackers players
Charleston Senators players
Charlotte Hornets (baseball) players
Dallas Rangers players
Denver Bears players
Fox Cities Foxes players
Habana players
Houston Astros players
Indianapolis Indians players
Indios de Ciudad Juárez (minor league) players
Kansas City Royals players
Lamesa Indians players
Leones del Caracas players
Major League Baseball left fielders
Major League Baseball players from Cuba
Cuban expatriate baseball players in the United States
Mexican League baseball players
Midland/Lamesa Indians players
Milwaukee Brewers players
Minnesota Twins players
Missoula Timberjacks players
Navegantes del Magallanes players
Oklahoma City 89ers players
Omaha Royals players
People from San José de las Lajas
Petroleros de Poza Rica players
Portland Beavers players
Richmond Braves players
Seattle Pilots players
Sultanes de Monterrey players
Syracuse Chiefs players
Tigres de Aragua players
Vancouver Mounties players
21st-century African-American people